Omar Acha (born July 1971 in Argentina) is an Argentine historian and political essayist. He is a researcher at the Consejo Nacional de Investigaciones Científicas y Técnicas and also at the Centro de Investigaciones Filosóficas (Argentina). He teaches Philosophy of History at the Universidad de Buenos Aires. He is also a member of the editorial board of Herramienta. Revista de Teoría y Crítica Marxista, published in Buenos Aires.

His main fields of expertise are Marxism, Socialism, Psychoanalysis, History, Peronism, Social History, Intellectual History

Works 
 El sexo de la historia. Intervenciones de género para una crítica antiesencialista de la historiografía, Buenos Aires, El Cielo por Asalto, 2000. 156 p. .
 Cuerpos, géneros e identidades. Estudios de historia de género en Argentina (compilación junto a Paula Halperin), Buenos Aires, Ediciones del Signo, 2000, 308 p. .
 Carta abierta a Mariano Grondona. Interpretación de una crisis argentina, Buenos Aires, Centro Cultural de la Cooperación, 2003.
 La trama profunda. Historia y vida en José Luis Romero, Buenos Aires, El Cielo por Asalto, 2005, 193 p. .
 La nación futura. Rodolfo Puiggrós en las encrucijadas argentinas del siglo XX, Buenos Aires, Editorial Universitaria de Buenos Aires, 2006, 330 p. .
 Freud y el problema de la historia, Buenos Aires, Prometeo Libros, 2007, 168 p. .
 La nueva generación intelectual. Incitaciones y ensayos, Buenos Aires, Herramienta Ediciones, 2008, 197 p. .
 Las huelgas bancarias, de Perón a Frondizi (1945-1962). Contribución a la historia de las clases sociales en la Argentina, Buenos Aires, Ediciones del Centro Cultural de la Cooperación, 2008, 254 p. .
 Historia crítica de la historiografía argentina. Vol. 1. Las izquierdas en el siglo XX, Buenos Aires, Prometeo Libros, 2009. 383 p. .
 Inconsciente e historia después de Freud. Cruces entre psicoanálisis, historia y filosofía (compilación junto a Mauro S. Vallejo), Buenos Aires, Prometeo Libros, 2010, 286 p. .
 Los muchachos peronistas. Orígenes olvidados de la Juventud Peronista, 1945-1955, Buenos Aires, Planeta, 2011, 252 p. .
 El hecho maldito. Conversaciones para otra historia del peronismo (en colaboración con Nicolás Quiroga), Rosario, Prohistoria Ediciones, 2012, 236 p. .
 Un revisionismo histórico de izquierda. Y otros ensayos de política intelectual, Buenos Aires, Herramienta Ediciones, 2012, 206 p. .
 Crónica sentimental de la Argentina peronista. Sexo, inconsciente y política, 1945-1955, Buenos Aires, Prometeo Libros, 2013, 409 p. .

References

1971 births
20th-century male writers
21st-century Argentine historians
Argentine essayists
Male essayists
Argentine male writers
Marxist historians
Living people
21st-century essayists
Place of birth missing (living people)